The Underside of Power is the second album by American experimental band Algiers. The album was released through Matador Records on June 23, 2017. The album was produced by Adrian Utley of Portishead and his frequent collaborator Ali Chant. It was also the band's first album to feature drummer Matt Tong as a full-time member.

Critical reception

The Underside of Power received widespread critical acclaim from contemporary music critics. At Metacritic, which assigns a normalized rating out of 100 to reviews from mainstream critics, the album received an average score of 86, based on 21 reviews, which indicates "universal acclaim".

In his review for AllMusic, Thom Jurek wrote that, "Algiers ultimately turn doomsday on its head unexpectedly. On The Underside of Power, they assert that even amid violence, darkness, and horror, that the human spirit is affirmed through witness and resistance, leading not only to solace but to redemption."

Accolades 
According to the website Acclaimed Music, The Underside of Power is the 23rd most acclaimed album of the year and the 190th most acclaimed of the decade.

Track listing

Personnel
All personnel credits courtesy of AllMusic.

Algiers
Franklin James Fisher – cello, double bass, drum programming, guitar, keyboards, percussion, piano, sampling, synthesizer, tambourine, vocals, wurlitzer
Ryan Mahan – bass, drum programming, guitar, baritone guitar, sampling, synthesizer, backing vocals
Lee Tesche – cymbals, guitar, harmonium, loop, music box, percussion, prepared guitar, prepared piano, saxophone, synthesizer, backing vocals
Matt Tong – chimes, drones, drums, glockenspiel, guitar, percussion, backing vocals

Additional musicians
Ashiya Eastwood – backing vocals
Jessica Upton Crowe – backing vocals
Travis Ono – backing vocals

Technical
Adrian Utley – producer, drum machine, guitar, moog bass, synthesizer
Ali Chant – producer, guitar, backing vocals
Alex Weston – engineer
Ben Greenberg – additional production, engineer
Chris Kyles – engineer
Jason Ward – mastering
Macks Faulkron – engineer, guitar, percussion
Oli Jacobs – engineer
Patrick Phillips – engineer
Paul Reust – engineer
Randall Dunn – mixing
Will Smith – mixing assistant

Charts

References

External links
 The Underside of Power LP

2017 albums
Algiers (band) albums
Matador Records albums